Bagan is an ancient city located in Myanmar.

Bagan may also refer to:

Bagan Kingdom
Bagan, Johor, Malaysia
Bagan, Russia
Bagan (river), Novosibirsk Oblast, Russia
Bagansiapiapi
Bagan, IAU-approved proper name of exoplanet HD 18742b, orbiting star Ayeyarwady (HD 18742) in Eridanus (constellation)
Butterworth, Penang
Bagan (federal constituency), represented in the Dewan Rakyat

People with the surname
David Bagan (born 1977), Scottish footballer
Joel Bagan (born 2001), English footballer

See also
Pagan (disambiguation)